Aureoboletus innixus is a species of bolete fungus in the family Boletaceae. Found in eastern North America, it was first described scientifically by Charles Christopher Frost in 1874, from collections made in New England. It has a bright yellow pore surface when young that dulls in color when mature. There are about 1 to 3 pores per mm when young, but they expand as they mature to about 2 mm wide. The spore print is olive-brown, and the spores are ellipsoid, smooth, and measure 8–11 by 3–5 um.

The mushroom is often confused with the similar Aureoboletus auriporus, which has a pinkish cinnamon to dark reddish brown cap.

See also

List of North American boletes

References

External links

innixus
Edible fungi
Fungi described in 1874
Fungi of North America